Karen Schmidt (born November 27, 1945) is an American politician who served in the Washington House of Representatives from the 23rd district from 1981 to 1999.

References

1945 births
Living people
Republican Party members of the Washington House of Representatives
Women state legislators in Washington (state)